The Madhya Kailash Junction is an important junction in the southern part of the city of Chennai. It is located at the beginning of the Rajiv Gandhi Salai (IT Expressway) which intersects the Sardar Patel Road in the form of "T".

Madhya Kailash Interchange
Local Administration minister, M K Stalin has made plans for building flyovers at Chennai city junctions with heavy vehicle density.
 
This includes Mint junction, Basin Bridge junction, LB Road - Thiruvanmiyur junction and Madhya Kailash - Old Mahabalipuram Road junction.

At the time of announcement in 2007, the construction of these flyovers, after the finalisation of the design was expected to start by 2007 year-end.
 and these bridges were expected to be completed in two years, or by 2009, but these promises have not been kept and these projects have remained unbuilt.

Trumpet interchange
 - TNRDC proposes... State Highways Department rejects... Govt yet to decide on the design.

A Trumpet interchange was proposed for this junction by TNRDC. The proposed interchange was supposed to start at the IT Expressway in front of Kasturba Nagar railway station and go parallel to MRTS line and then turn about while splitting into two joining the Sardar Patel Road. In March 2007, the Secretary to the Highways Department  K. Allaudin, clarified that this proposal had been rejected by the State Government - as it felt land acquisition would be a problem and the facility could possibly be a disturbance to educational institutions nearby. The Indian Institute of Technology, Anna University and the State Highways department engineers had presented three different and independent project proposals for easing traffic congestion. 
 
As of December 2007, the corporation and Govt were yet to finalise the design and alignment of the flyover.

See also

Koyambedu Junction
Kathipara Junction
Padi Junction
Maduravoyal Junction

References

External links 
TNRDC
 "How to manage traffic congestion?" - M K Stalin (blog)

Neighbourhoods in Chennai
Bridges and flyovers in Chennai